The Church of All Saints is a Church of England parish church in Clifton, Bristol. The church is a grade II listed building. It is located in the Parish of All Saints with St. John Clifton in the Diocese of Bristol.

History
In 1862, a committee was set up to provide a large church for the Clifton area of Bristol. It would be in the Anglo-Catholic tradition, and would be a free church with no rented pews. The original church was built between 1868 and 1872 by George Edmund Street. The chancel was consecrated on 8 June 1868. A narthex was added in 1909 by George Frederick Bodley, and a sacristy was added in 1928 by Frederick Charles Eden.

On 2 December 1940, an incendiary bomb set fire to the building, destroying the chancel and nave of the church. Only the tower, narthex, and sacristy remained standing. W. H. Randoll Blacking was the architect chosen to reconstruct the church, but, after much delay, he died before work could begin.

In the 1960s, it was once more decided that the rebuilding of the church should go ahead and Robert Potter was selected as the architect. He reorientated the church so that the altar now faces East. The altar itself is free standing and is set under a ciborium, a four-columned indoor roof. Behind the font is a series of stained glass windows made from fibre glass and designed by John Piper. The new nave and altar were consecrated on 1 July 1967.

On 8 January 1959, the church was designated a grade II listed building.

Present day
In 1978, the parish of All Saints Clifton was joined with that of St John's Clifton to form the Parish of All Saints with St. John Clifton. St John's Church was declared redundant in 1980.

In March 2013, the parochial church council voted to rescind Resolutions A and B, and to rescind the petition for alternative episcopal oversight. With these actions, the parish signalled that it accepts the ordination of women. It remains within the Anglo-Catholic tradition of the Church of England.

Archives
Parish records for the Church of All Saints, Clifton are held at Bristol Archives (Ref. P.St ASC) (online catalogue) including baptism and marriage registers and plans of the remodelling from 1963. The archive also includes records of the incumbent, churchwardens, parochial church council, charities and choir school.

Notable people

 Cedric Bucknall, organist

Clergy

 Henry Bromby, former vicar, previously Dean of Hobart
 Fabian Jackson, former vicar, later Bishop of Trinidad
 Diarmaid MacCulloch, non-stipendiary deacon from 1987 to 1988, later Professor of the History of the Church at the University of Oxford
 Richard Randall, first vicar from 1868 and 1892, later Dean of Chichester

Gallery

References

External links
Parish website
A Church Near You entry

All Saints, Clifton
All Saints, Clifton
All Saints, Clifton
All Saints